Renewer of Society is a title given by the Lutheran Book of Worship to selected individuals commemorated in its Calendar of Saints whom it sees as having contributed dramatically to the development and vitality of society. The individuals specifically designated by one or more Lutheran churches with this term include:

Martin Luther King Jr., commemorated on January 15
Harriet Tubman, commemorated on March 10
Sojourner Truth, commemorated on March 10
Toyohiko Kagawa, commemorated on April 23
Florence Nightingale, commemorated on August 13
Clara Maass, commemorated on August 13
Dag Hammarskjöld, commemorated on September 18.
Theodor Fliedner, commemorated on October 4
Martin de Porres, commemorated on November 3.
Elizabeth of Hungary, commemorated on November 17.

References
Evangelical Lutheran Church in America. Evangelical Lutheran Worship - Final Draft. Augsburg Fortress Press, 2006.  Available at 
Lutheran Church - Missouri Synod. Lutheran Worship.  Concordia Publishing House, 1982.
Lutheran Church - Missouri Synod. Lutheran Service Book.  Concordia Publishing House, 2006.

Lutheran liturgy and worship